Douglas Fox may refer to:

Douglas Harold Fox, US Navy officer
Charles Douglas Fox, British civil engineer known as (Sir) Douglas Fox
Douglas Fox (organist), British organist and conductor